Robert A. "Bob" Israel is a music composer and producer, having created the themes to ABC Television shows World News Tonight with Peter Jennings, 20/20, This Week, and Nightline. He founded the company Score Productions.  His themes are among "the most familiar pieces of music on television".

Israel initially dreamed of being a concert pianist but wound up scoring theme songs for game shows and television shows and background music for film and TV.  He actively declines to write music for commercials, finding it "a bore" and reliant on decisions made by groups of clients.

References

American television composers
Male television composers
Living people
Year of birth missing (living people)